The Governor-General of the Federation of Rhodesia and Nyasaland (also known as the Central African Federation) served as the representative of the British monarch in the country. The federation was formed on 1 August 1953 from the former colonies of Southern Rhodesia, Northern Rhodesia and Nyasaland, and was formally dissolved on 31 December 1963.

As Salisbury (now Harare) became the capital of the Federation as well as Southern Rhodesia, Government House, previously used as the residence of the Governor of Southern Rhodesia, became the residence of the Governor-General of the Federation. During this time, the Governor of Southern Rhodesia resided in Governor's Lodge in the suburb of Highlands.

List of governors-general of the Federation of Rhodesia and Nyasaland

Notes

See also
Prime Minister of the Federation of Rhodesia and Nyasaland
Governor of Southern Rhodesia
Governor of Northern Rhodesia
List of colonial governors of Nyasaland

Sources

References

External links
World Statesmen – Federation of Rhodesia and Nyasaland

 
Rhodesia and Nyasaland
Rhodesia and Nyasaland, Governor-General
History of the Federation of Rhodesia and Nyasaland
Malawi history-related lists
Lists of political office-holders in Zambia
Lists of political office-holders in Zimbabwe